Aircraft 140 may refer to:

 serial number 140, of an aircraft model
 aircraft registration tail number 140

Aircraft models
 OKB-1 140, a Soviet forward-swept-wing jet prototype
 Agusta GA.140
 Amiot 140
 Antonov An-140
 ANF Les Mureaux 140T
 Avro Canada TS-140
 Blohm & Voss Ha 140
 Caudron C.140
 Cessna 140
 Farman F.140 Super Goliath
 Lockheed CP-140 Aurora
 Lockheed JetStar C-140
 Morane-Saulnier MS.140
 Nieuport 140
 Potez-CAMS 140
 SAN Jodel D.140 Mousquetaire
 Schröder AS-140 Mücke
 Yakovlev Yak-140

Flights
 China Airlines Flight 140

See also
 140 (number)